Hainanese chicken rice is a dish of poached chicken and seasoned rice, served with chilli sauce and usually with cucumber garnishes. It was created by immigrants from Hainan in southern China and adapted from the Hainanese dish Wenchang chicken. 

It is considered one of the national dishes of Singapore and is most commonly associated with Singaporean cuisine, being widely available in most food courts and hawker centres around the country. Variants of the dish can also be seen throughout Southeast Asia, particularly in Malaysia and Thailand, where it remains a culinary staple.

History
Hainanese chicken rice is a dish adapted from early Chinese immigrants originally from Hainan province in southern China. It is based on a well-known Hainanese dish called Wenchang chicken, which is one of four important Hainan dishes dating to the Qin dynasty. The Hainanese in China traditionally used a specific breed, the Wenchang chicken, to make the dish. They would usually cook rice with the leftover chicken stock to create a dish known as "Wenchang chicken rice". The original dish was adapted by the Hainanese overseas Chinese population in the Nanyang area (present-day Southeast Asia). Wenchang chicken rice remained a dish for special occasions in Hainanese homes in Singapore until the 1940s. 

Almost every country in Asia with a history of immigration from China has a version. The San Francisco Chronicle says, "the dish maps 150 years’ immigration from China's Hainan Island...to Singapore and Malaysia, where the dish is often known as Hainan chicken rice; to Vietnam, where it is called "Hai Nam chicken"; and to Thailand, where it has been renamed "khao man gai" ("chicken fat rice")."

In Singapore

In Singapore, the dish was born out of frugality, created by servant-class immigrants trying to stretch the flavour of the chicken.

The first chicken rice restaurants opened in Singapore during Japanese occupation in World War II, when the British were forced out and their Hainanese servants lost their source of income. One of the first was Yet Con, which opened in the early 1940s. There were also sources stating that Wang Yiyuan, a street hawker first started selling "chicken rice balls wrapped in banana leaves " in Singapore during the 1920s. The dish was popularised in Singapore in the 1950s by Moh Lee Twee, whose Swee Kee Chicken Rice Restaurant operated from 1947 to 1997. Hong Kong food critic Chua Lam credits Moh with the creation of the dish.

Hainanese chicken rice is considered one of Singapore's national dishes. It is eaten "everywhere, every day" in Singapore and is a "ubiquitous sight in hawker centres across the country". The chicken is typically served with seasoned rice, with chilli sauce and usually with cucumber garnishes. While most commonly associated with Singaporean cuisine, the dish is also seen throughout Southeast Asia and in parts of the United States, where the dish is named "Singapore chicken rice" in some places. The dish is widely popular in Singapore and can be found in hawker centres, restaurants and hotels.

In August 2021, Singapore's McDonald's launched a Hainanese Chicken burger which is significantly derived from the dish, in part of the country's celebration for National Day which falls on 9 August.

Controversy over origin
In a debate that stretches back decades to 1965, when the two countries split, Malaysia and Singapore have both laid claim to inventing the dish.

In 2009, then Malaysian Tourism Minister Ng Yen Yen said that Hainanese chicken rice was "uniquely Malaysian" and had been "hijacked" by other countries. Ng later clarified that she was misquoted on her intention to patent the foods, and that a study on the origins of the foods would be conducted "and an apology conveyed if it was wrongly claimed."

In 2018, then Malaysian Finance Minister Lim Guan Eng joked that Singapore claimed "chicken rice is theirs (and) if we’re not careful, ‘char koay teow‘ will become theirs" one day.

The debate has been described as an example of gastronationalism.

Reception

Catherine Ling of CNN called Hainanese chicken rice one of the "40 Singapore foods we can't live without". It was listed as one of the "World's 50 best foods" by CNN in 2018. David Farley of the BBC called it "the dish worth the 15-hour flight" and said it was "deceptively simple – which is good, because on paper it sounds awfully boring." Saveur called it "one of the most beloved culinary exports of Southeast Asia."

Variations

Malaysia

In Malaysia, nasi ayam (literally "chicken rice" in Bahasa Melayu) is "a culinary staple" and a popular street food, particularly in Ipoh, a center of Hainanese immigration.

The general term nasi ayam can refer to multiple variations including roasted and fried chicken, can be served with a variety of sauces including barbecue, and can be accompanied by a variety of side dishes including steamed rice rather than seasoned 'oily' rice, soup, or chicken offal.

In Malacca and Muar, the rice is served in balls rather than in bowls; this dish is commonly known as Chicken rice balls. Steamed rice is shaped into golf ball-sized orbs and served alongside the chopped chicken.

Singapore

The chicken is prepared in accordance with traditional Hainanese methods, which involve poaching the entire chicken at sub-boiling temperatures to both cook the bird and produce the stock. The bird is dipped in ice after cooking to produce a jelly-like skin finishing and hung to dry.

The stock is skimmed of fat and some of the fat and liquid, along with ginger, garlic, and pandan leaves, are used in the cooking of the rice, producing an oily, flavourful rice sometimes known as "oily rice". In Singapore "the most important part of chicken rice is not the chicken, but the rice."

The dish is served with a dipping sauce of freshly minced red chilli and garlic, usually accompanied with dark soy sauce and freshly ground ginger. Fresh cucumber boiled in the chicken broth and light soy sauce with a dash of sesame oil is served with the chicken, which is usually served at room temperature. Some stalls may also serve nonya achar as an additional side.

Thailand

Hainanese chicken rice is a common dish in Thailand where it is called khao man kai, literally meaning "chicken oily rice". The chickens used in Thailand for this dish are usually free range chickens of local breeds, resulting in a leaner and tastier texture; however, meat from chickens of large scale poultry farms are increasingly being used. Khao man kai is served with a garnish of cucumbers and occasionally chicken blood tofu and fresh coriander, along with a bowl of nam sup, a clear chicken broth which often contains sliced daikon. The accompanying sauce is most often made with tauchu (also known as yellow soybean paste), thick soy sauce, chilli, ginger, garlic and vinegar.

One famous Bangkok neighbourhood for Khao man kai is Pratunam in Ratchathewi district, located near to Platinum Fashion Mall, CentralWorld and Ratchaprasong Intersection. Some restaurant in Pratunam received Bib Gourmand awards from the 2018 Michelin Guide. It has been reported that these restaurants are especially popular amongst Hong Kong, Japanese and Taiwanese tourists. Khao man kai is also well known in other areas, including Bang Sue, Yaowarat and Phasi Charoen near Bang Wa BTS station and Phyathai 3 Hospital including various places viz Thanon Tok near Rama III Bridge, Thong Lor on Sukhumvit Road, Wat Suthiwararam School, Yan Nawa, Bang Kapi, Wat Saket and Saphan Kwai neighbourhoods.

Vietnam
The dish is known as Cơm Gà Hải Nam in Vietnamese, and was common in South Vietnam prior to the Fall of Saigon.

In popular culture
Khao man kai is a 1998 Ruangsak "James" Loychusak single. Loychusak's grandmother sold Khao man kai in his native Nakhon Si Thammarat.
 Rice Rhapsody (alternative title Hainan Chicken Rice) is a 2004 Singaporean comedy set in a successful chicken rice restaurant in Singapore's Chinatown.
 Chicken Rice War is a 2000 Singaporean romantic comedy adaptation of Romeo and Juliet featuring two rival chicken rice hawker families whose children fall in love.
 Hainanese chicken rice was featured on the Netflix TV series Street Food in season 1.

See also

 Wenchang chicken
 Laksa
 Peranakan cuisine
 Chinese Indonesian cuisine

References

Chicken and rice dishes
Chinese chicken dishes
Chinese cuisine outside China
Chinese-Malaysian culture
Chinese rice dishes
Chinese-Singaporean culture
Chinese-Thai culture
Chicken rice
Malaysian chicken dishes
Malaysian rice dishes
National dishes
Singaporean rice dishes
Thai cuisine